Orkustra was a band that tried a synthesis between symphonic orchestra and psychedelic band. The result was a sort of freeform psychedelia. According to member Bobby Beausoleil, the group was originally known as "The Electric Chamber Orchestra."  The name was changed to avoiding limiting bookings to small venues .  The band existed a little more than a year before splitting in the summer of 1967. Beausoleil went on to work with Kenneth Anger and played the main role in the film Lucifer Rising before becoming involved with Charles Manson and his gang. Another player was David LaFlamme who later founded It's a Beautiful Day.  Beausoleil has called the group "a launch pad to all of its members"  During their heyday the band released no recordings, but RD Records of Switzerland has now released an LP with Orkustra music in collaboration with Beausoleil.

External links

BeauSoleil, Bobby.  ""The Orkustra: Light Shows for the Blind."  

The Orkustra (first psychedelic electric symphony orchestra)

Psychedelic rock music groups from California